This is the list of rural banks in Ghana. Rural banks were first established in Ghana in 1976 to provide banking services to the rural population, providing credit to small-scale farmers and businesses and supporting development projects, with the first being in Agona Nyakrom in Central Region. The banks are locally owned and managed. By 2002 115 rural banks had been established. They are supervised by the clearing bank ARB Apex Bank under the regulation of the Bank of Ghana, which owns shares in the banks.

See also
 Atwima Rural Bank
 Economy of Ghana
 Bank of Ghana

References

External links 
 Official website of the Bank of Ghana

Further reading

Banks of Ghana